James Harry "Red" Steiner (January 7, 1915 – November 16, 2001) was a professional baseball catcher. He played a total of 38 games in Major League Baseball during 1945 for the Cleveland Indians and Boston Red Sox.

Biography
Steiner played for various minor league teams from 1934 to 1944, then one final season with the Sacramento Solons of the Pacific Coast League in 1950; he appeared in a total of 1165 minor league games.

Steiner was one of many players who only appeared in the major leagues during World War II. During the  season, he played 12 games for the Cleveland Indians, had his contract sold for $7500 on August 10, and then played 26 games for the Boston Red Sox. Overall, he was 15-for-79 at the plate for a .190 batting average, with no home runs and six RBIs. In 28 catching appearances, he posted a .989 fielding percentage (one error in 91 chances).

Steiner additionally played in the Mexican League during 1946, 1947, and 1949.

Steiner was a native of Los Angeles, California. He died in Gardena, California, at the age of 86 in 2001.

References

Further reading

External links

Boston Red Sox players
Cleveland Indians players
Ponca City Angels players
Los Angeles Angels (minor league) players
Moline Plow Boys players
Tulsa Oilers (baseball) players
Hartford Bees players
Indianapolis Indians players
Jersey City Giants players
Sacramento Solons players
Tecolotes de Nuevo Laredo players
Azules de Veracruz players
Major League Baseball catchers
Baseball players from Los Angeles
1915 births
2001 deaths
American expatriate baseball players in Mexico
Jefferson High School (Los Angeles) alumni